Bishopstoke, a village recorded in the Domesday Book, is a civil parish in the borough of Eastleigh in Hampshire, England. Bishopstoke was also mentioned when King Alfred the Great's grandson King Eadred, granted land at "Stohes" to Thegn Aelfric in 948 AD. The village is about a mile east of Eastleigh town centre, and is on the eastern bank of the River Itchen. It adjoins Fair Oak on the east, in the Fair Oak and Horton Heath parish. The village was annexed to Eastleigh in 1932, and was split out again as an independent civil parish later. It forms part of the Southampton Urban Area.

Itchen Valley Navigation

The Itchen Valley Navigation between Winchester and Southampton was completed in 1710 and in use until 1869. Much of it runs through Bishopstoke, including a sluice in use until the closure.

Stoke Park Woods
Bordering the village to the North and comprising about 207 ha (512 acres), the Stoke Park area contains 61 per cent woodland and 39 per cent arable. Its many plant species include rare quaking grass. Originally these woods were owned by the Bishop of Winchester. King John of England hunted them in 1205. In 1540 they were licensed by King Henry VIII as a fenced deer hunt.

The woods were bought by the Forestry Commission in 1948 and are now community woodland managed by Forestry England to produce wood for paper pulp and timber. Local groups have been set up to fight council plans for a new housing development, that they argue, would destroy the inter-woodland countryside and significantly damage the ancient woodland around Stoke Park, including Upper Barn, Crowdhill copses, Bishopstoke and Fair Oak Local Green Space.

Popular sites include the locally popular Eastleigh Falls, a semi-natural rapidly flowing chalk stream that supports a variety of locally rare plant and animal species. The site has been recognised as important habitat for Northern crested newt (Triturus cristatus). There are ongoing efforts by local activists to classify the area as an SSSI ensuring its protection from the proposed development projects.

Notable people
Among those born or resident in Bishopstoke have been:
Richard Dummer (1589–1679), early settler in New England described as "one of the fathers of Massachusetts"
Edith Escombe (1866–1950), fiction writer and essayist
William Gilbert (1804–1890), novelist and Royal Navy surgeon, father of dramatist W. S. Gilbert
Henry Hamilton Bailey (1894–1961), influential author of surgical textbooks.
Samuel Sewall (1652–1730), Massachusetts judge, best known for involvement in the Salem witch trials

Today
Bishopstoke contains one infant school, Stoke Park Infant School, and one Junior School, Stoke Park Junior School. which feeds the secondary school in Fair Oak, Wyvern College. The village has a Girl Guide group off West Drive, including Rainbow, Brownie and Guide units. It is also home to both the 13th Eastleigh Scouts in St Paul's Church and 12th Eastleigh Scouts on West Drive. Eastleigh's museum in the High Street, which is open from Tuesday to Saturday, holds several files containing information about Bishopstoke's historic past and associated personalities, such as John Bale, Samuel Sewall, and Dean Garnier.

Bishopstoke still retains many buildings dating from the 18th century, although the village is expanding and now has a number of newer built residential and commercial premises. It has effectively become divided into  Old Bishopstoke and New Bishopstoke, heading roughly West to East, reflecting the recent housing requirements within the area.

There are four churches in the village: St. Mary's and the St. Paul's, both Church of England, Bishopstoke Evangelical Church in Stoke Park Road, and Bishopstoke Methodist Church in Sedgwick Road.

Farm land
The  Eastleigh borough council has been purchasing farmland in order to protect against climate change and increase diversity.

See also
List of places of worship in the Borough of Eastleigh

References

Further reading

External links

Villages in Hampshire
Borough of Eastleigh